Sapria himalayana, commonly known as the hermit's spittoon, is a rare holoparasitic flowering plant related to Rafflesia found in the Eastern Himalayas. Sapria himalayana represents the extreme manifestation of the parasitic mode, being completely dependent on its host plant for water, nutrients and products of photosynthesis which it sucks through a specialised root system called haustoria. These haustoria are attached to both the xylem and the phloem of the host plant.

Geographical distribution
It has been recorded in Namdapha National Park in Northeast India. There are historical records of the species from other areas in Northeast India such as Mishmi Hills Aka Hills in Arunachal Pradesh, and in Assam, Manipur and Meghalaya, but there have been no recent records of the species from these areas. In Thailand it is found in Doi Suthep National Park, Doi Inthanon, Doi Phu Kha National Park, Thung Yai Naresuan Wildlife Sanctuary, Kaeng Krachan National Park in the Tenasserim Hills. It is also found in the Dawna and Karen Hills of Myanmar and in Vietnam. Its natural habitat are evergreen forests at altitudes between 800 and 1,450 metres.

In Vietnam, it is only known from the Lang Biang Plateau, where it has been recorded at Tuyền Lâm Lake, the Nam Ban Protection Forest, and the Cam Ly area.

Recently, Sapria himalayana has also been spotted by one amateur researcher and Child specialist by profession Dr. Jayom Karlo in the hills of Perlek Modi (94⁰49′ 18″ E to 94⁰44′ 47″ E and 27⁰ 49′ 10″ N to 27⁰47′ 45″ N) of West Siang District, Arunachal Pradesh.

On 12 Nov 2020, in a village called Khunbi (Yulli), Tengnoupal District (neighbouring district of Myanmar), Manipur, India has spotted Sapria himalayana by a villager while tracking in a jungle nearby the village.

Description
The visible body is globose. The flowers are about 20 cm across, dioecious and unisexual. They have 10 bracts and are bright red in colour covered with sulphur-yellow spots. They appear above the ground, bloom for 2–3 days and have a putrid odour. Flowers are fleshy with imbricate inflorescence. Perianth is campanulate. Male flowers have 2-loculed anthers, broadly ellipsoid, dehiscent by apical pores; apical cupular body base convex; gynostegium blood red. The female flowers have a concave cupular body base with sterile stamens. Gynostegium stouter than stamens. Flowering and fruiting season occurs between December and February. After blooming, the flower dehisces and becomes dark in colour and subsequently decomposes slowly. Fruits are swollen and crowned with perianth. The seeds are of the size of a grape fruit and are blackish-brown in colour.

Sapria is a root parasite and its usual hosts are lianas such as Vitis and Tetrastigma. The flowering shoot is short, erect and unbranched. It has been suggested that flies pollinate it while seed dispersal may be by rodents, but this has not been confirmed by direct observation.

References

External links
 Liming Cai et al.: Deeply Altered Genome Architecture in the Endoparasitic Flowering Plant Sapria himalayana Griff. (Rafflesiaceae). Current Biology, published online January 23, 2021; doi:10.1016/j.cub.2020.12.045. See also:
  Scientists Sequence Genome of Rare Parasitic Flowering Plant. On: sci-news. Jan 25, 2021

Rafflesiaceae
Parasitic plants
Flora of East Himalaya
Flora of Assam (region)
Flora of Myanmar
Flora of Thailand
Flora of Vietnam